Gyula Forró (born 6 June 1988) is a Hungarian football player who currently plays for Dorogi FC.

Career statistics

References
Player profile at HLSZ 
Gyula Forró at Soccerway

1988 births
Living people
Footballers from Budapest
Hungarian footballers
Association football midfielders
MTK Budapest FC players
Soroksári TE footballers
FC Dabas footballers
BKV Előre SC footballers
Kecskeméti TE players
Újpest FC players
Puskás Akadémia FC players
Nyíregyháza Spartacus FC players
Dorogi FC footballers
Győri ETO FC players
Nemzeti Bajnokság I players
Nemzeti Bajnokság II players
Hungary international footballers